Dowlatkhaneh Rural District is a rural district (dehestan) in Bajgiran District, Quchan County, Razavi Khorasan province, Iran. At the 2006 census, its population was 9,285, in 2,441 families.  The rural district has 26 villages.

References 

Rural Districts of Razavi Khorasan Province
Quchan County